CX 46 Radio América is a Uruguayan Spanish language AM radio station that broadcasts from Montevideo, Uruguay.

References

External links
 
 1450 AM

Spanish-language radio stations
Radio in Uruguay
Mass media in Montevideo